M.O.B.: The Album is the debut album by hip hop group ByrdGang. The album was released digitally on June 17, 2008, and the physical copy was in stores July 1, 2008.

The album's first single was "Splash" performed by Jim Jones, Chink Santana, Juelz Santana & NOE.

Track listing
From Amazon.

Charts

References

2008 debut albums
Jim Jones (rapper) albums
Albums produced by Chink Santana
Albums produced by DJ Green Lantern
Asylum Records albums